Michael Laverty (born 7 June 1981) is an occasional motorcycle racer from Toomebridge, Northern Ireland. After participating in the 2017 season in the British Superbike Championship aboard a Yamaha YZF-R1, and the 2018 season on a Tyco BMW, Laverty became a television commentator and occasional rider in Endurance events.

For 2021, Laverty established a young-riders' academy, to act as a competition stepping-stone, based on race-styled minibikes. Laverty also has Moto 3 machines available for occasional wildcard race entries.

In September 2021, Laverty announced live on BT Sport, the television provider he is contracted to as a motorcycle race pundit, that he was to establish a new race team for 2022 out of the former Petronas Moto3 team, run by Johan Stigefelt, which will be disbanded at the end of the 2021 season. The team for 2022 with British riders Scott Ogden and Josh Whatley will be known as Vision Track Honda after the title-sponsor, also active in BSB as Vision Track Ducati. Laverty will act as race-team principal, with Taylor Mackenzie as team manager.

He was the 2007 British Supersport Champion, and raced regularly in British Superbikes, plus occasional races in the World Supersport series and in American AMA Superbike Racing. His brother Eugene is a World Superbike rider and brother John was also a racer.

Career

British Superbike and Supersport World Championship
He raced in Supersport from 2001 to 2004, finishing in the championship top 5 in all but his rookie season, and done assorted World Supersport races.

In 2005 and 2006 he raced for the Stobart Honda team in the British Superbike Championship. In 2005 he was 10th overall with podiums at Knockhill and Snetterton, his achievements earning him the title of 'Irish Motorcyclist of the Year' from Irish Racer magazine. In 2006 he was teammate to Michael Rutter. Helped by a pair of 5th places at Knockhill in round 7 he came 7th overall, ahead of the more experienced Rutter.

For 2007, Michael moved back to the British Supersport Championship, with the successful Relentless Racing by TAS Suzuki team. He beat teammate Ian Lowry to the title, and moved back up to BSB with the team for 2008. He took two fourth places early on in the season and finished 9th overall, but decided to leave the team for 2009.

For 2009 Michael competed in the USA riding in selected rounds of the AMA Superbike Championship with Celtic Racing.  Michael finished in the top 10 at every round he competed in, with a 2nd position to Mat Mladin at the Road America round being his best result.  He also competed in selected World Supersport rounds and joined the CRS team for the latter part of the 2009 season.

In January 2010, Laverty confirmed that he had re-signed with the Relentless Suzuki team to ride in the 2010 British Superbike Championship season.

In May 2010, Laverty took his and the Relentless Suzuki by TAS team's first Superbike victory, in race two of the third round of the 2010 British Superbike Championship at Oulton Park.

In the 2013 and 2014 seasons, Laverty competed in MotoGP on a CRT bike run by Paul Bird and his PBM Team.

The WEPOL Endurance Racing team, run by the German Penz13.com squad with Laverty replacing Matthieu Lagrive placed fourth in races at Le Mans (April 2019) and Slovakiaring (May 2019). They had to abandon their home race in Oschersleben after a technical failure and finished 5th in the overall standing of the 2018-2019 season.

Career statistics

British Superbike Championship
(key) (Races in bold indicate pole position, races in italics indicate fastest lap)

Notes
1. – Laverty qualified for "The Showdown" part of the BSB season, thus before the 11th round he was awarded 500 points plus the podium credits he had gained throughout the season. Podium credits are given to anyone finishing 1st, 2nd or 3rd, with 3,2 and 1 points awarded respectively.

Grand Prix motorcycle racing

By season

By class

Races by year
(key) (Races in bold indicate pole position, races in italics indicate fastest lap)

Supersport World Championship

Races by year
(key) (Races in bold indicate pole position, races in italics indicate fastest lap)

References

External links

British Superbike official site profile
Michael's Crash.net articles

1981 births
Living people
British motorcycle racers
Motorcycle racers from Northern Ireland
British Superbike Championship riders
Supersport World Championship riders
FIM Superstock 1000 Cup riders
Gresini Racing MotoGP riders
MotoGP World Championship riders